Cheng Hede (22 July 1873 - 14 November 1928) was a Chinese Roman Catholic Bishop of Roman Catholic Diocese of Hubei, China.

Biography
Cheng was born in Laohekou, Hubei, on July 22, 1873. Cheng primarily studied at Chayuangou Catholic Church. In 1883 he went to study in Italy.

In January 1903 he returned to China and that same year became vice president of Chayuangou Catholic Church, where he worked there for 14 years. He wrote piety books and historical works, translated Saint Francis of Assisi's rule from Italian to Chinese, and wrote an Italian grammar book intended for Chinese readers.

On March 2, 192, he was appointed bishop of the Roman Catholic Diocese of Puqi by the Pope Pius XI. On May 15, he attended the National Catholic Bishop Conference in Shanghai.

On October 28, 1926, he and five other Chinese priests (Philippus Zhao Huaiyi, Simon Zhu Kaimin, Hu Ruoshan, Melchior Sun De-zhen, and Chen Guodi) were ordained bishops by Pope Pius XI in Rome. Then they had traveled to France, Belgium and other countries.

Cheng returned to China in 1927. He died in Hengyang, Hunan, on November 13, 1928. He was buried in Puqi.

References

1873 births
1928 deaths
People from Xiangyang
20th-century Roman Catholic bishops in China